Manfred (1306 – 9 November 1317), infante of Sicily, was the second son of Frederick III of Sicily and Eleanor of Anjou.

He was appointed Duke of Athens and Neopatria in 1312 by his father at the request of the knights of the Catalan Company then in control of Athens. Manfred was only five when he was named duke. His father sent Berenguer Estanyol as his regent.

In 1316, Alfonso Fadrique, Manfred's elder (but illegitimate) brother, was appointed vicar general of Athens. The young Duke never set foot in his realm, however, for he died in a fall from his horse before his twelfth birthday. He died in Trapani and was buried in the Dominican church located there. His younger brother William succeeded him as duke.

References
Fiske, H. Acta Aragonensia. Berlin-Leipzig, 1908.

  
 
Setton, Kenneth M. Catalan Domination of Athens 1311–1380. Revised edition. Variorum: London, 1975.

1306 births
1317 deaths
Dukes of Athens
House of Barcelona (Sicily)
Deaths by horse-riding accident in Italy
Sons of kings